Robert Michael Biancucci is an Australian Paralympic athlete. At the 1988 Seoul Games, he won a  gold medal in the Men's 800 m C8 event, a silver medal in the Men's 400 m C8 event, and a bronze medal in the Men's 200 m C8 event. He competed but did not win any medals at the 1992 Barcelona Games.

References

External links
 Robert Biancucci at Australian Athletics Historical Results
 

Paralympic athletes of Australia
Athletes (track and field) at the 1988 Summer Paralympics
Athletes (track and field) at the 1992 Summer Paralympics
Paralympic gold medalists for Australia
Paralympic silver medalists for Australia
Paralympic bronze medalists for Australia
Living people
Medalists at the 1988 Summer Paralympics
Year of birth missing (living people)
Paralympic medalists in athletics (track and field)
Australian male sprinters
Australian male middle-distance runners